The Bloc Québécois (BQ) ran seventy-five candidates in the 1997 Canadian federal election, covering all of the ridings in the province of Quebec. Forty-four of the party's candidates were elected, giving the Bloc third-place status in the House of Commons of Canada.

Many of the party's candidates have separate biography pages; information about others may be found here.

Candidates

Brome—Missisquoi: Noël Lacasse
Noël Lacasse was listed as a retired teacher in 1997. He ran for mayor of Magog, Quebec, in 1994 and 1998, without success. He also planned to run for the BQ's nomination in Brome—Missisquoi for a 1995 by-election, but he later agreed to withdraw in favour of high-profile candidate Jean-François Bertrand. In 1997, Lacasse finished third against Liberal Party incumbent Denis Paradis.

References

Candidates in the 1997 Canadian federal election
1997